The Pokaiwhenua Stream is a tributary of the Waikato River. It flows into Waikato River at Lake Karapiro.

The Pokaiwhenua Stream is approximately 56 km in length. The Waikato River Trail starts close to the mouth of the stream.

References

External links 
River Flow – Pokaiwhenua at Puketurua – NIWA managed recording site
Water Quality – Pokaiwhenua Stream at Arapuni-Putaruru Rd – Waikato Regional Council

Tributaries of the Waikato River
Rivers of Waikato
Rivers of New Zealand